The Conalep Ing. Bernardo Quintana Arrioja (Conalep IBQA) is a high school campus in Mexico. It was named in this way in honor of the Mexican civil engineer, Bernardo Quintana. It belongs to the campuses that are part of the National College of Professional Technical Education in the State of Mexico and its located in the municipality of Cuautitlán Izcalli.

Bernardo Quintana
Bernardo Quintana was a Mexican civil engineer who greatly contributed to the development of Mexico's infrastructure during the second part of the 20th century. He was founder and first president of the National Chamber of the Construction Industry in 1953. In 1968, Quintana multiplied the industry in the city of Querétaro up to nine times, including urban transport, water and electricity services, drainage, among others. As recognition to his contributions, one of the main avenues of Santiago de Querétaro bears his name: Boulevard Bernardo Quintana, which is one of the busiest avenues in the city. In his memory, the Conalep institution presents an award that rewards students from its different schools in various categories.

History

In 2020, face-to-face classes on campus were suspended due to the COVID-19 pandemic in Mexico, with the last day of classes inside the classrooms taking place on 19 March. Instead, online classes were held, concluding the semester in this way. On 7 September, the new semester began under the modality "distance education" within the campus, as in schools in other states. Despite the fact that the return of face-to-face classes in the State of Mexico had been agreed for 14 June 2021, the campus chose not to return and continued with distance classes, concluding another semester in this modality on 23 July of the same year, and with one more generation of students, corresponding to the years 2018–2021, finishing their studies in this way and without graduation in person.

Principals
Among the principals of the campus were the teacher Dulce María Olvera Mancera in 2014 and Alma Teresa Trujillo Avalos, who began directing in 2016 and terminated her position in 2020.

The current principal of the campus is the public accountant José Lorenzo Lozada Ramírez, who began serving as authority figure in February 2020.

Educative offer
The campus offers four technic careers, Accounting, Computing, Machines and tools and Mechatronics.

Previously, the campus also offered the Automatic Systems Maintenance career, replaced in 2018 with Mechatronics.

Campus activities
In 2019, teacher Joselito Emmanuel Lozada Guarneros of the campus, presented at the Conalep talent expo in 2019, which was also attended by students from the campus, exposing the topic natural language processing applied in the detection of asperger syndrome. The campus organizes a race under the name "Carrera Lobos Runs Conalep", which takes place in Cuautitlán Izcalli. Service to the community and care for the environment are also encouraged.

In 2020, a "Comipems 2020" course (which consists of teaching basic knowledge to be able to take an assignment exam and be able to enter a high school) was held within the campus facilities with the permission of the principal José Lozada, which had to be terminated virtually due to the COVID-19 pandemic.

Galería

References

External links 

 

1985 establishments in Mexico
Cuautitlán Izcalli
Educational institutions established in 1985
High schools in Mexico